"Diary" is  a song recorded by American singer-songwriter Tino Coury, released as the first single from his debut EP, Page One, on May 4, 2010. The single peaked in the top twenty of the Billboard Dance/Club Play chart. The song was featured in the games Tap Tap Revenge 3 and Tap Tap Revenge 4.

Chart positions

References

2010 singles
Music videos directed by Roman White
2010 songs